The Georgian National Olympic Committee (GNOC) (sakartvelos erovnuli olimp'iuri k'omit'et'i) is a Georgian national constituent of the worldwide Olympic movement. It is an umbrella organization for 12 regional bodies, the Georgian Olympic Academy, the Georgian Olympians’ Association, and the Olympic Museum.

History
The GNOC was established on October 6, 1989, and gained a preliminary and a full recognition from the International Olympic Committee on March 9, 1992, and September 23, 1993, respectively.

Presidents

See also
Georgia at the Olympics

External links 
 Official website

1989 establishments in Georgia (country)
National Olympic Committees
Georgia (country) at the Olympics
Olympic
Sports organizations established in 1989